Ray L Moorcroft FRIBA was chief architect for British Rail from 1977, and is best known for his work on the passenger hall of Euston railway station.

Career
Moorcroft started with British Rail as an architect in the London Midland Region, working with William Robert Headley. He succeeded Bernard Kaukas as Chief Architect to British Rail in 1977, when Kaukas was appointed Director of Environment.

Works
Esso Petroleum Company, Davies Street, London. 1954 (modernisation)
Manchester Piccadilly railway station 1959-64
Railway hostel, Tyseley, Birmingham 1962
Euston railway station passenger hall 1966-68  with William Robert Headley
King's Cross railway station 1963-68 (rebuilding)
Wolverhampton railway station 1964-67
Northampton railway station 1965-66 (rebuilding)
Rail House, Crewe 1967-68 (with Frederick Francis Charles Curtis)
Birmingham International railway station 1976

Publications
Aspects of Railway Architecture 1985

References

20th-century English architects
British railway architects
British Rail people
Fellows of the Royal Institute of British Architects